The U.S. Post Office and Courthouse, also known as Statesville City Hall, is a historic post office and courthouse building located at Statesville, Iredell County, North Carolina. It was designed in the Richardsonian Romanesque style by Willoughby J. Edbrooke and built in 1891.  It is a rectangular 2 1/2-story structure, seven bays wide, and three bays deep.  It is constructed of red brick and sandstone. The building has a two-story corner tower, one-story entrance pavilion with central arched recessed entrance, and a tall hip roof.

It was listed on the National Register of Historic Places in 1974. It is located in the Statesville Commercial Historic District.

References

Courthouses on the National Register of Historic Places in North Carolina
Government buildings completed in 1891
Buildings and structures in Iredell County, North Carolina
Statesville
Richardsonian Romanesque architecture in North Carolina
National Register of Historic Places in Iredell County, North Carolina
Historic district contributing properties in North Carolina